Sean Flynn (born 2 March 2000) is a Scottish cyclist, who currently rides for UCI WorldTeam .

Major results

Road

2021
 8th Dorpenomloop Rucphen
2022
 3rd Overall Istrian Spring Trophy
1st Stage 1
 4th Overall Okolo Jižních Čech
 4th Paris–Tours Espoirs
 4th Strade Bianche di Romagna
 5th Poreč Trophy
 8th Coppa della Pace
 9th Overall Le Triptyque des Monts et Châteaux
 10th Road race, Commonwealth Games
2023
 8th Bredene Koksijde Classic

Cyclo-cross
2017–2018
 1st  National Junior Championships
 Junior National Trophy Series
1st Abergavenny
 Junior DVV Trophy
2nd Antwerpen

Mountain Bike
2018
 3rd  Summer Youth Olympics (with Harry Birchill)
2018
 1st  Cross-country, National Junior Championships
2019
 2nd Cross-country, National Under-23 Championships

References

External links

2000 births
Living people
Scottish male cyclists
Sportspeople from Edinburgh
Cyclists at the 2022 Commonwealth Games